Proverbial name may refer to:
Archetypal name
Proverbial name (Africa), a way of personal name formation in some African cultures